Spey may refer to:
Spey River (disambiguation)
Spey casting, a fly fishing technique developed on the River Spey
Rolls-Royce Spey, an early turbofan engine
HMS Spey, the name of seven ships of the Royal Navy
 For spey-wife -- see Völva a pagan Norse shaman

See also
Spay (disambiguation)